Bindu is a 2009 Sri Lankan Sinhala children's film directed by Somaratne Dissanayake and produced by his wife Renuka Balasooriya for Cine Films Lanka. It stars Sachin Chathuranga and Ruvindika Ishadini in lead roles along with Jayalath Manoratne and Kumara Thirimadura. Music composed by Rohana Weerasinghe. The film revolves around a child boy and girl make an eternal relationship with a baby elephant Bindu and the consequences results from the relationship around them. The film has shot around Sigiriya.

Cast
 Sachin Chathuranga as Muthu
 Ruvindika Ishadini as Malee
 Jayalath Manoratne as Kolamba haadaya
 Kumara Thirimadura as Saping
 Jayani Senanayake as Gune's wife
 Athula Liyanage as Wildlife officer
 Sarath Kothalawala as Minister
 Nilmini Buwaneka as Saping's wife

Awards and nominations
Bindu won the Special Jury Award at the Lucas International Film Festival in 2011.

References

2009 films
2000s Sinhala-language films